Fat March is an American reality television series on the ABC network, based on the UK Channel Four series Too Big To Walk. It premiered on August 6, 2007 and ended on September 10, 2007.

The show had received mixed reactions from fitness experts. Experts such as cardiologist James Rippe are critical of ABC's Fat March. Even the name "suggests that these people are being punished for being heavy, but this show sends a message that walking is painful, you get blisters, you get hurt and it's humiliating. They've made a spectacle of people who did this with all good intentions," he says.

Synopsis 
The show focused on twelve individuals walking from the starting line of the Boston Marathon, over 550 miles to Washington, D.C., for a prize of US$1.2 million.

The show focused on teamwork by starting with the initial prize of 1.2 million dollars, meaning each contestant will receive $100,000 upon completion.  However, at the end of each episode, contestants have the opportunity to nominate any of their team for removal from the walk. Any time someone is voted out, is physically unable to continue, or chooses to stop, each remaining individual's share is cut by $10,000.  Participants can choose to vote for no one. It only takes one vote for a person to be ejected; thus if 11 people vote for no one, but one person votes for someone, that one person who received one vote is eliminated.

Participants 

Wendy, 40, 5'6", 234 pounds, professional singer and author: A construction company owner who resides in La Canada, California.  She is married with a seven-year-old stepdaughter and wants to return to the stage as a singer and songwriter, but needs to lose weight first.  Wendy had four top 40 hits in Europe in the nineties.

Wendy was injured in week one with bone spurs and chronic Plantar Fasciitis, which forced her to leave the march during Stage 3 in Greenwich, Connecticut after walking 205 miles in 5 weeks.

 Chantal, 35, 5'2", 250 pounds, comedian: A student who resides in Brookline, Massachusetts. She dreams of one day owning a pair of slim designer jeans.

She completed Fat March, weighing in at 199 pounds, losing a total of 51 pounds.

 Jami Lyn, 30, 5'9", 236 pounds, military wife: A housewife who resides in Daleville, Alabama. She is the mother of three children and finds it difficult to be so much larger than her husband and the only big person in the family.

Jami Lyn completed Fat March weighing 186 pounds, losing a total of 50 pounds. 2008. 
 
 Kimberly, 39, 5'5", 274 pounds, former rap diva: A real estate investor who resides in Duluth, Georgia. She was once known as the rap artist Tempest with a top 20 album in Europe. She was in the group Sweetbox.  Her mother and father died four months apart due to weight-related issues when Kim was 15 years old. Prior to this show, she was a contestant on season 1 of I Want to Work for Diddy, using her nickname, Poprah.

Kim quit the march in Stage 1.

Loralie, 30, 5'3", 233 pounds, wants to have a baby: A marketing resources expert who lives in Milwaukee, Wisconsin.  She is married and dreams of starting a big family, but her doctor requires that she lose weight first before becoming pregnant.

Loralie completed Fat March, losing a total of 56 pounds, with a final weight of 185 pounds.  Loralie became pregnant after the show and gave birth to her first child, a son, in September 2008.

Shea, 27, 5'7", 280 pounds, former college softball player: A makeup/special effects artist who resides in Indian Rocks Beach, Florida.  She is embarrassed that she is the biggest person in the makeup trailer, and her parents are worried about how her weight is affecting her health.

Shea completed Fat March weighing a total 234 pounds, losing a total of 55 pounds.

Anthony, 26, 6'3", 410 pounds: He is unemployed and resides in Addison, Illinois.  He is determined not to let being overweight kill him. He is billed on-screen as a "26-year-old virgin."

He was voted off after Stage 5.

Matt, 36, 6'4", 386 pounds: He resides in Cincinnati, Ohio and is married with two children. He was released from the WWE the year prior when officials felt he was too heavy and it was not safe for him to compete. He must lose weight to return to his career. Matt died in 2017.

Matt quit the march in Pennsylvania during Stage 5 due to his bad knee.

Michael, 41, 6' 2½", 330 pounds: A lab technician who resides in Elwood, Illinois. He is married with two children and says he has tried every diet "from A to Z."

Michael completed Fat March, weighing in at 239, losing a total of 88 pounds.

Sam, 22, 5'9", 371 pounds: A certified massage therapist who lives in Everett, Massachusetts, is single, and believes that his weight has kept him from being hired for work.  He wrestles in independent wrestling promotions as "Ma'kua".

Sam completed Fat March, losing a total 85 pounds, with a final weight of 297 pounds.

Shane, 34, 6'0", 519 pounds: A youth minister who lives in Mesquite, Texas. He is married with a two-year-old child and another due in October, and wants to be around to watch them grow up.

Voted out after Stage 1.

Will, 26, 6'2", 470 pounds: A retail clerk who resides in Brooklyn, New York. He eats competitively, is single with no children and would like to inspire others to lose weight and get in shape.

Voted out after Stage 4.

Episodes

Episode 1 aired August 6, 2007
Episode 2 aired August 13, 2007
Episode 3 aired August 20, 2007
Episode 4 aired August 27, 2007
Episode 5 aired September 3, 2007
Episode 6 aired September 10, 2007 – finale

Weight ins

 Voted Out – Will at Stage 4 and Anthony at Stage 5
 Quit – Kimberly (Stage 1) 
 Left due to medical reasons – Shane had stress fractures in both feet – Matt had a bad knee – Wendy had Plantar Fasciitis.

Pounds lost per stage

Miles walked per stage

Stage 1 – Day 8 – 65 miles
Stage 2 – 3 weeks – 150 miles
Stage 3 – 5 weeks – 205 miles
Stage 4 – ? weeks – 330 miles
Stage 5 – 8 weeks – 450 miles
Stage 6 – 10 weeks – 575 miles

References

External links

Official Website (via Internet Archive)
Wendy Alane Wright Official Site
Loralie Thomas Official Site
Full Episodes of Fat March

Fitness reality television series
2007 American television series debuts
2007 American television series endings
2000s American reality television series
American Broadcasting Company original programming
American television series based on British television series